Fungie, also known as the Dingle Dolphin, was a male common bottlenose dolphin. He became separated from other wild dolphins and lived in very close contact with the people of Dingle on the southwest coast of Ireland.

Wild bottlenose dolphins are estimated to have a median lifespan between 8.3 and 17.4 years, while one bottlenose has been observed to live for at least 67 years. Fungie was first seen in Dingle harbour in 1983 and continued to seek out human contact over the following 38 years. Thus, Fungie was fully grown and likely already in his middle or even old age at the time of his disappearance in October 2020. By 2019, it was estimated that he was at least 40 years of age and Guinness World Records declared him to be the oldest solitary wild dolphin in the world. His long life led to rumours that the original Fungie had died at some point and had been replaced with a lookalike, to avoid damage to tourism, but this was dismissed by locals, who pointed out that a dolphin introduced to the harbour would simply leave and it would not be possible to train a newly introduced dolphin to stay.

Fungie was known to interact playfully with swimmers, surfers, kayakers and divers in the water. There have not been any recorded cases of Fungie being aggressive towards humans. Although it is normal for social animals like dolphins to live in close contact with each other, it is still a rare occurrence for them to seek out human contact, and Fungie is the first recorded occurrence of a dolphin interacting positively with humans in the wild in Ireland. Fungie had been frequently observed eating garfish, something not previously known to be eaten by dolphins.

In October 2020, there was concern for his welfare after he had gone missing for several days, having last been seen on 13October.  Marine experts have declared that he either moved on to new waters, or simply died, and reported sightings by the general public after 15October were dismissed as "well-intentioned, but incorrect".

See also
 List of individual cetaceans

References

External links
 A Dolphin Has Been Living Solo In This Irish Harbor For Decades - Smithsonian

20th-century animal births
2020 animal deaths
Dingle
Individual animals in Ireland
Individual dolphins
Individual wild animals
Solitary dolphins
Tourist attractions in County Kerry